Michael Keili  was the inaugural Bishop of Bo, serving from 1981 until 1994.

References

Anglican bishops of Bo
20th-century Anglican bishops in Sierra Leone